Archidendron is a genus of flowering plants in the pea family, Fabaceae.

Species

 Archidendron alatumde Wit	  
 Archidendron alternifoliolatum  (T.L.Wu) I.C.Nielsen	  
 Archidendron apoense  (Elmer) I.C.Nielsen	  
 Archidendron arborescens  (Kosterm.) I.C.Nielsen	  
 Archidendron aruense  (Warb.) Dewit	 
 Archidendron balansae  (Oliv.) I.C.Nielsen	  
 Archidendron baucheri  (Gagnep.) I.C.Nielsen	  
 Archidendron beguinii  de Wit	   
 Archidendron bellum  Harms	  
 Archidendron bigeminum  (L.) I.C.Nielsen	    
 Archidendron borneense  (Benth.) I.C.Nielsen	 
 Archidendron brachycarpum  Harms	  
 Archidendron brevicalyx  Harms	   
 Archidendron brevipes  (K.Schum.) Dewit	  
 Archidendron bubalinum  (Jack) I.C.Nielsen 
 Archidendron calliandrum  de Wit	  
 Archidendron calycinum  Pulle	  
 Archidendron chevalieri  (Kosterm.) I.C.Nielsen	    
 Archidendron clypearia  (Jack) I.C.Nielsen 
subsp. subcoriaceum(Thwaites) I.C.Nielsen 
 Archidendron cockburnii  I.C.Nielsen	 
 Archidendron conspicuum  (Craib) I.C.Nielsen  
 Archidendron contortum  (C.Mart.) I.C.Nielsen	  
 Archidendron cordifolium  (T.L.Wu) I.C.Nielsen	  
 Archidendron crateradenum  (Kosterm.) I.C.Nielsen  
 Archidendron dalatense  (Kosterm.) I.C.Nielsen 
 Archidendron eberhardtii  I.C.Nielsen	  
 Archidendron ellipticum  (Blanco) I.C.Nielsen  
 Archidendron fagifolium  (Miq.) I.C.Nielsen	  
 Archidendron falcatum  I.C.Nielsen	  
 Archidendron fallax  Harms	
 Archidendron forbesii  Baker f.	    
 Archidendron glabrifolium  (T.L.Wu) I.C.Nielsen	  
 Archidendron glabrum  (K.Schum.) Lauterb. & K.Schum.	 
 Archidendron glandulosum  Verdc.	    
 Archidendron globosum  (Blume) I.C.Nielsen  
 Archidendron glomeriflorum  (Kurz) I.C.Nielsen	  
 Archidendron gogolense  (Lauterb. & K.Schum.) Dewit  
 Archidendron grandiflorum  (Benth.) I.C.Nielsen	 
 Archidendron harmsii  Malme 
 Archidendron havilandii  (Ridl.) I.C.Nielsen	 
 Archidendron hendersonii  (F.Muell.) I.C.Nielsen	   
 Archidendron hirsutum  I.C.Nielsen	
 Archidendron hispidum  (Mohlenbr.) Verdc.  
 Archidendron hooglandii  Verdc.	 
 Archidendron jiringa  (Jack) I.C.Nielsen	  
 Archidendron kalkmanii  (Kosterm.) I.C.Nielsen  
 Archidendron kerrii  (Gagnep.) I.C.Nielsen 
 Archidendron kinubaluense  (Kosterm.) I.C.Nielsen  
 Archidendron kubaryanum  (Warb.) Schumann & Lauterb.  
 Archidendron kunstleri  (Prain) I.C.Nielsen  
 Archidendron laoticum  (Gagnep.) I.C.Nielsen	  
 Archidendron lovelliae  (Bailey) I.C.Nielsen  
 Archidendron lucidum  (Benth.) I.C.Nielsen  
 Archidendron lucyi  F.Muell.	  
 Archidendron megaphyllum  Merr. & L.M.Perry 
 Archidendron merrillii  (J.F.Macbr.) I.C.Nielsen  
 Archidendron microcarpum  (Benth.) I.C.Nielsen	  
 Archidendron minahassae  (Koord.) I.C.Nielsen	  
 Archidendron molle  (K.Schum.) Dewit  
 Archidendron monopterum  (Kosterm.) I.C.Nielsen	   
 Archidendron mucronatum  Harms	 
 Archidendron muellerianum  (Maiden & R.T.Baker) Maiden & B 
 Archidendron multifoliolatum  (H.Q. Wen) T.L. Wu	  
 Archidendron muricarpum  (Kosterm.) Verdc.  
 Archidendron nervosum  de Wit	
 Archidendron novo-guineense  (Merr. & L.M.Perry) I.C.Nielsen	
 Archidendron oblongum (Hemsl.) de Wit
 Archidendron occultatum  (Gagnep.) I.C.Nielsen	  
 Archidendron oppositum (Miq.) I.C.Nielsen  
 Archidendron pachycarpum  (Warb.) Dewit	  
 Archidendron pahangense  (Kosterm.) I.C.Nielsen	   
 Archidendron palauense  (Kaneh.) I.C.Nielsen  
 Archidendron parviflorum  Pulle	   
 Archidendron pauciflorum  (Benth.) I.C.Nielsen	  
 Archidendron pellitum  (Gagnep.) I.C.Nielsen	  
 Archidendron poilanei  (Kosterm.) I.C.Nielsen  
 Archidendron ptenopum  Verdc.
 Archidendron quocense  (Pierre) I.C.Nielsen  
 Archidendron ramiflorum  (F.Muell.) Kosterm. 
 Archidendron robinsonii  (Gagnep.) I.C.Nielsen 
 Archidendron royenii  Kosterm.	  
 Archidendron rufescens  Verdc.	  
 Archidendron sabahense  I.C.Nielsen  
 Archidendron scutiferum  (Blanco) I.C.Nielsen  
 Archidendron sessile  (Scheff.) Dewit	
 Archidendron syringifolium  (Kosterm.) I.C.Nielsen  
 Archidendron tenuiracemosum  Kaneh. & Hatus.  
 Archidendron tetraphyllum  (Gagnep.) I.C.Nielsen  
 Archidendron tjendana  (Kosterm.) I.C.Nielsen  
 Archidendron tonkinense  I.C.Nielsen 
 Archidendron trichophyllum  (Kosterm.) I.C.Nielsen 
 Archidendron trifoliolatum  de Wit 
 Archidendron triplinervium  (Kosterm.) I.C.Nielsen 
 Archidendron turgidum  (Merr.) I.C.Nielsen 
 Archidendron utile  (Chun & F.C.How) I.C.Nielsen	   
 Archidendron vaillantii  (F.Muell.) F.Muell.  
 Archidendron whitei  I.C.Nielsen	   
 Archidendron xichouense  (C. Chen & H. Sun) X.Y. Zhu  
 Archidendron yunnanense '' (Kosterm.) I.C.Nielsen

References

 
Taxonomy articles created by Polbot
Fabaceae genera